USA-246, also known as Advanced Extremely High Frequency 3 or AEHF-3, is a military communications satellite operated by the United States Air Force. It is the third of six satellites to be launched as part of the Advanced Extremely High Frequency program, which replaced the earlier Milstar system.

Satellite 
The USA-246 satellite was constructed by Lockheed Martin Space, and is based on the A2100 satellite bus. It will be used to provide super high frequency (SHF) and extremely high frequency (EHF) communications for the United States Armed Forces, as well as those of the United Kingdom, the Netherlands, and Canada.

Launch 

USA-246 was launched by United Launch Alliance, aboard an Atlas V 531 flying from Space Launch Complex 41 (SLC-41) at the Cape Canaveral Air Force Station (CCAFS). After a number of weather-related delays, the launch occurred at 08:10:00 UTC on 18 September 2013, placing the satellite in a parking orbit of 178 kilometers by 1,041 kilometers. The satellite was successfully deployed in this orbit 50 minutes after launch.

See also 

 2013 in spaceflight

References 

USA satellites
Spacecraft launched in 2013
Spacecraft launched by Atlas rockets